The Shorty Lovelace Historic District includes a series of cabins built in Kings Canyon National Park by trapper Joseph Walter "Shorty" Lovelace between 1910 and 1940. Lovelace was the first non-Native American to live year-round in the upper Kings River Canyon. Lovelace may have built as many as thirty-six structures in the area, with possible a dozen surviving. Lovelace built his first cabins in 1912 at Crowley Canyon. The cabins were typically five feet by seven feet with dirt floors.

Structures include:

Williams (Quartz) Meadow Cabin
Sphinx Creek Cabin
Crowley Canyon Cabin
Granite Pass Cabin
Vidette Meadow Cabin
Gardiner Creek Cabin
Woods Creek Cabin
Cloud Canyon Cabin
Lower Bubbs Creek

References

External links

 at the National Park Service's NRHP database

National Register of Historic Places in Kings Canyon National Park
Historic districts on the National Register of Historic Places in California
Buildings and structures in Tulare County, California
National Register of Historic Places in Tulare County, California
National Register of Historic Places in Fresno County, California